Dorion Sagan (born 1959) is an American essayist, fiction writer, poet, and theorist of ecology. He has written and co-authored books on culture, art, literature, evolution, and the history and philosophy of science, including Cosmic Apprentice, Cracking the Aging Code, and Lynn Margulis: The Life and Legacy of a Scientific Rebel. His book Into the Cool, co-authored with Eric D. Schneider, is about the relationship between non-equilibrium thermodynamics and life. His works have been translated into 15 languages and are widely cited in critical theory since the "nonhuman turn," in new materialist theory, and in feminist science studies.

Family
Sagan is the son of astronomer Carl Sagan and biologist Lynn Margulis. He has four siblings. His half-brother Nick Sagan is a science fiction writer.

Bibliography
 Books

 Livro de seres invisiveis (2021)
 Cosmic Apprentice: Dispatches from the Edges of Science (2013) 
 Lynn Margulis: The Life and Legacy of a Scientific Rebel (2012, Sciencewriters Books) 
 Death and Sex (two-in-one book with Tyler Volk, 2009) 
 Biospheres: Metamorphosis of Planet Earth (1990) 
 Notes from the Holocene: A Brief History of the Future (2007) 
 Cooking with Jesus: From the Primal Brew to the Last Brunch (2001) 
 The Sciences of Avatar (2010) 

Co-written with Lynn Margulis
 Microcosmos: Four Billion Years of Evolution from Our Microbial Ancestors (1986) 
 Origins of Sex : Three Billion Years of Genetic Recombination (1986) 
 Garden of Microbial Delights: A Practical Guide to the Subvisible World (1988) 
 Biospheres from Earth to Space  (1989)
 Mystery Dance: On the Evolution of Human Sexuality  (1991)
 What Is Sex?  (1995)
 What Is Life? (1995) 
 Slanted Truths: Essays on Gaia, Symbiosis, and Evolution (1997)
 Acquiring Genomes: A Theory of the Origins of Species (2002) 
 Dazzle Gradually: Reflections on the Nature of Nature (2007) 

Co-written with Eric D. Schneider
 Into the Cool: Energy Flow, Thermodynamics, and Life (2005) 

Co-written with others
 Cracking the Aging Code: The New Science of Growing Old - And What It Means for Staying Young (2016 - with Josh Mitteldorf)
 Up From Dragons: The Evolution of Human Intelligence (2002 - with John Skoyles)
 Within the Stone: Nature's Abstract Rock Art (2004 - partial text to book of photographs by Bill Atkinson)
 Atheist Universe: The Thinking Person's Answer to Christian Fundamentalism (2006 - foreword to book by David Mills)
 Darwin's Unfinished Business: The Self-Organizing Intelligence of Nature (2011 - with Simon G Powell)

 Essays

 "Möbius Trip: The Technosphere and Our Science Fiction Reality" Technosphere Magazine (2017)
 "Metametazoa: Biology and Multiplicity" (1992 - In Incorporations: Fragments for a History of the Human Body, Jonathan Crary and Sanford Kwinter, editors, Zone, pp. 362–385)
 "Partial closure: Dorion Sagan reflects on Carl" (1997 - Whole Earth, summer, pp. 34–37)
 "Gender Specifics: Why Women Aren't Men" (1998 - The New York Times )
 "The Beast with Five Genomes" (2001 - with Lynn Margulis - Natural History June, pp. 38–41)
 "The Postman Already Always Rings Twice: Fragments for an Understanding of the Future" (2004 Cabinet: A Quarterly of Art and Culture, pp. 23–27)
 "Gradient-Reduction Theory: Thermodynamics and the Purpose of Life" (2004 - with Jessica H. Whiteside. In Scientists Debate Gaia: The Next Century MIT Press)
 "A Brief History of Sex" (2007 - Cosmos [Australia], June/July, pp. 50–55)
 "Evolution, Complexity, and Energy Flow" (2008 - Back to Darwin: A Richer Account of Evolution John B. Cobb Jr., Editor, William B. Eerdmans Publishing Company, pp. 145–156)
 "What is the Cultural Relevance of Bacteria?" (2009 - Sputnik Observatory) 

 Short Stories

 "The Tchaikovsky Dream Continuum" Cabinet, Issue 54 The Accident (Summer 2014)
 "The New Age Witch" (1993) After Hours, #19, summer, pp. 36–45
 "Love’s Strangers" (2006) Meat for Tea: The Northampton Review, summer, Vol. 1, Issue 3, "Flesh," pp. 3–10
 "Semi-Naked" (2006) Meat for Tea: The Northampton Review, winter, Vol. 1, Issue 1, "Gristle," pp. 5–24

Awards and honors 
  First place, Silent Mora Ring 122 International Brotherhood of Magicians – 1974 
  EdPress Excellence in Educational Journalism Award, Nonprofit National – 1986 
  Humana Scholarship – Centre College Danville, Kentucky (2003)
  Lindisfarne Fellowship – Lindisfarne (2008 –)
  Advisory Board – Sputnik Inc (2009 –)

References
"Dorion Sagan." (June 15, 2005). Contemporary Authors Online. Retrieved May 20, 2007.

External links

Cabinet Magazine essays 
Into the Cool website (as archived in 2014)
 
Sputnik Observatory Interviews
Biography page, The Edge Foundation
Online audio interview with Lynn Margulis and Dorion Sagan
"Second Nature" (article)
Letters (discussing "Turing Gaia," the natural basis of teleology)  to Olivia Judson “Wild Side” column, topic “Heavy Weather,” The New York Times

1959 births
Living people
American people of Russian-Jewish descent
American science writers
Place of birth missing (living people)
Jewish American writers
Writers from Madison, Wisconsin
Sagan family
Carl Sagan